Haemaphysalis bispinosa is a hard-bodied tick of the genus Haemaphysalis. It is found in India, Sri Lanka, Myanmar, Pakistan, Nepal, Australia, and Indonesia. It is an obligate ectoparasite of mammals. It is a potential vector of Kyasanur Forest disease virus. These ticks was found parasitized by a chalcid Hunterellus sagarensis in these diseased areas.

Parasitism
Adults parasitize various wild and domestic mammals such as domestic cattle, goats, and sheep and various bird species. It is a potential vector of Bartonella bovis, which causing Bartonellosis.

References

External links
Identification and characterization of Rhipicephalus (Boophilus) microplus and Haemaphysalis bispinosa ticks (Acari: Ixodidae) of northeast India by ITS2 and 16S rDNA sequences and morphological analysis.
ON THE LIFE HISTORY OF HAEMAPHYSALIS BISPINOSA NEUMANN, 1897
Acaricidal activity of synthesized titanium dioxide nanoparticles using Calotropis gigantea against Rhipicephalus microplus and Haemaphysalis bispinosa

Ticks
Ixodidae
Animals described in 1897